Tazehabad-e Doveyseh (also Romanized as Tāzehābād-e Doveyseh; also known as ‘Īsáābād, Tāzehābād, and Tāzehābād-e 'Īsáābād) is a village in Sarab Qamish Rural District, in the Central District of Sanandaj County, Kurdistan Province, Iran. At the 2006 census, its population was 79, in 19 families. The village is populated by Kurds.

References 

Towns and villages in Sanandaj County
Kurdish settlements in Kurdistan Province